Carson Peak is a  mountain summit located in the Sierra Nevada mountain range, in Mono County of northern California, United States. It is situated in the Ansel Adams Wilderness, on land managed by Inyo National Forest. The mountain is visible from various locations along the June Lake Loop, and from the nearby June Mountain ski area. The summit offers impressive views of Mount Ritter and Banner Peak. The mountain consists of granite of Lee Vining Canyon. Carson Peak is considered an eastern Sierra classic by backcountry skiers drawn to routes called the "Devils Slide" and "Petes Dream".

Climate
According to the Köppen climate classification system, Carson Peak has an alpine climate. Most weather fronts originate in the Pacific Ocean, and travel east toward the Sierra Nevada mountains. As fronts approach, they are forced upward by the peaks, causing them to drop their moisture in the form of rain or snowfall onto the range (orographic lift). Precipitation runoff from this mountain drains into tributaries of Rush Creek.

History
The peak was named after Roy Carson, who died in 1949. While Roy was employed by the Rush Creek Hydroelectric Project in the area, he established the area's first resort in 1916, known as Carson's Camp, at Silver Lake. The fishing resort featured tents until 1920 when the first cabin was completed. This geographical feature's name has been officially adopted by the U.S. Board on Geographic Names.

Gallery

See also

 List of mountain peaks of California

References

External links

 Weather forecast: Carson Peak
 Webcam
 Carson Peak climbing: Mountainproject.com

Mountains of Mono County, California
Mountains of the Ansel Adams Wilderness
North American 3000 m summits
Mountains of Northern California
Sierra Nevada (United States)
Inyo National Forest